New York's 103rd State Assembly district is one of the 150 districts in the New York State Assembly. It has been represented by Sarahana Shrestha since 2023, defeating then-incumbent Kevin Cahill.

Geography
District 103 contains a majority of Ulster County and a portion of Dutchess County. The city of Kingston and the town of New Paltz are included in this district.

Recent election results

2022

2020

2018

2016

2014

2012

References

103
Ulster County, New York
Dutchess County, New York